Lisgar GO Station is a railway station on GO Transit's Milton line in Mississauga, Ontario, Canada. It opened for service on September 4, 2007.

The station is located at Argentia Road and Tenth Line, near the interchange of Highway 401, and Highway 407. It is named after the Lisgar neighbourhood in which it is located, which is itself named after Lord Lisgar, second Governor General of Canada from 1869–1872.

The station was built to alleviate the congested Meadowvale GO Station, and to provide better service for the local community. The station provides parking spaces for 788 vehicles. Construction began on new canopies, walkways and shelters in August 2014 and was completed in early 2015.

In spring 2009, a 50 kW wind turbine was constructed at the station and was expected to supply up to 80% of the station's power. Taking advantage of the heavy prevailing winds from the west, the turbine is the first application of on-site wind generation for a North American transit system. However, after four years, the turbine was only producing 9% of its projected output.

Connecting buses
MiWay
32 Lisgar GO
38/38A Creditview
Brampton Transit
11 Steeles
511 Züm Steeles
Milton Transit
21 Steeles (starting September 6, 2022)
GO Transit
21 Milton/Toronto

References

External links

GO Transit railway stations
Galt Subdivision
Railway stations in Canada opened in 2007
Railway stations in Mississauga
2007 establishments in Ontario